John Skut was the royal tailor during the reign of Henry VIII of England.

Services 
Skut began his services to Katherine of Aragon in 1519 and served all of the King's six wives: Katherine of Aragon, Anne Boleyn, Jane Seymour, Anne of Cleves, Katherine Howard and Katherine Parr.

References

15th-century births
16th-century deaths
British tailors
16th-century English people